Rafael Abramovich Grugman (born 16 October 1948) is a Russian writer, journalist, engineer, programmer and college educator.

Biography 
Rafael Grugman was born in Odessa, Ukraine, USSR and graduated from Novosibirsk Electrotechnical Institute (NETI) in Russia (now Novosibirsk State Technical University, NSTU).

During student years he worked as a journalist for several Novosibirsk newspapers. In 1971 he returned to Odessa to work as an engineer for more than twenty years, authoring and contributing to more than 50 patents and scientific articles that were published in Moscow technical magazines.

In the mid-1980s, during the years of social and political reforms in the USSR, known as the Perestroika, he again becomes a journalist, publishing his work in leading newspapers in Odessa, and conducted interviews with diplomats and military and political figures. He was the first editor of the Jewish newspaper Ha-Meletz, published in Odessa after the collapse of the USSR.

He lives in the United States since 1996. He has held various positions working as a programmer, journalist and writer. Presently, he is teaching at a local college in New York.

Rafael Grugman the author of fiction and non-fiction books that were published in Russia, Ukraine, United States and Israel. In March 2009 the fiction story "The Wagner Lecture" received "Honorable Mention" in the Glimmer Train Fiction Open competition. The dystopian novel Nontraditional Love  was published by Liberty Publishing House in November 2008 and nominated for the 2009 Rossica Translation Prize (London, 2009).

Fiction book published in USA (translated from Russian)
 Nontraditional Love  — New York: Liberty Publishing House, 2008 — The Twenty Third Century: Nontraditional Love, — Strelbytskyy Multimedia Publishing, 2017
 Napoleon's Great-Great-Grandson Speaks — Strelbytskyy Multimedia Publishing, 2017
 The Messiah Who Might Have Been. I Was Churchill's Mistress — 2018

Fiction books 
Bride of the Sea — Ukraine, Odessa: Title, 1994
 Borya, get out from the sea  — Ukraine, Odessa: Southwest, 1995
 Nuzhna mne vasha farshirovannaya ryba  — Ukraine, Odessa: Printing House, 2004
 Borya, get out from the sea – 2. Odessa Tales — Russia, Moscow, Rodina, 2019
 Forbidden Love — Russia, Moscow, Rodina, 2020
 Testament of Mazepa, Prince of the Holy Roman Empire, revealed in Odessa to the great-great-grandson of Napoleon Bonaparte  — Russia, Moscow, Rodina, 2021

Nonfiction books 
Vladimir Jabotinsky, the indomitable Samson — Israel, Isradon, 2010
  Soviet square: Stalin-Khrushchev-Beria-Gorbachev  — Russia, Piter, 2011
  Svetlana Alliluyeva. The five lives  — Russia, Phoenix, 2012
  Jabotinsky and Ben-Gurion: The Right and Left Poles of Israel — Russia, Phoenix, 2014
  The Death of Stalin: All the Versions - And One More  — Russia, Moscow, Eksmo, Algoritm, 2016
  Svetlana Alliluyeva to Pasternak. "I've crossed my Rubicon" (” — Russia, Moscow, Algoritm, 2018
  Woman and War: From Love to Hate  — Russia, Moscow, Algoritm, 2018
  The Death of Stalin. All the Versions And One More  — Russia, Moscow, Eksmo, Rodina, 2021

References

Notes 
 "Nontraditional love" on Amazon Kindle
 "Nontraditional love" on Amazon
 Interview with Rafael Grugman for an Israeli magazine "We are here", in Russian
 Interview with Rafael Grugman for an Israeli magazine "Kol-Ha-Uma", in Russian

1948 births
People from Odesa
Living people
20th-century Russian male writers
Russian male novelists
Writers from Odesa
Russian journalists
Soviet engineers
Soviet journalists
Russian male journalists
American writers of Russian descent
Odesa Jews
American people of Russian-Jewish descent
Novosibirsk State Technical University alumni